Memoriał Henryka Łasaka is a single-day road bicycle race held annually in August in Lesser Poland Voivodeship and Silesian Voivodeship, Poland. It was first held in 1999 and from 2005 to 2007, the race was organized as a 1.1 event on the UCI Europe Tour, before moving down to category 1.2.

Winners

Cycle races in Poland
UCI Europe Tour races
Recurring sporting events established in 1999
Sport in Lesser Poland Voivodeship
1999 establishments in Poland
Summer events in Poland